Kaskaskia Township is one of twenty townships in Fayette County, Illinois, USA.  As of the 2010 census, its population was 650 and it contained 289 housing units.

Geography

Unincorporated towns
 Shobonier

Cemeteries
The township contains these five cemeteries: Britton, Farmer, Heckethorn, Lee and McConnell.

Major highways
  US Route 51

Demographics

School districts
 Patoka Community Unit School District 100
 Vandalia Community Unit School District 203

Political districts
 Illinois' 19th congressional district
 State House District 102
 State Senate District 51

References
 
 United States Census Bureau 2007 TIGER/Line Shapefiles
 United States National Atlas

External links
 City-Data.com
 Illinois State Archives

Townships in Fayette County, Illinois
Populated places established in 1859
Townships in Illinois
1859 establishments in Illinois